K-560 Severodvinsk is a  nuclear-powered cruise missile submarine of the Russian Navy, and the lead vessel of the class. The submarine is named after the city of Severodvinsk. She is deployed with the Russian Northern Fleet.

History

The construction of the submarine started in 1993 and was first planned to be launched in 1998. However budgetary problems delayed the construction for years, and it was only launched on 15 June 2010. Severodvinsk began its sea trials on 12 September 2011 and it returned from the first voyage by 6 October 2011.

On 7 November 2012, Severodvinsk successfully launched a Kalibr cruise missile (anti-ship version) from submerged position at a sea target in the White Sea. Later that month, the submarine successfully test fired two additional Kalibr cruise missiles (land attack version). The launches occurred on 26 November 2012 from a surfaced position and two days later from a submerged position.

Severodvinsk was handed over to the Russian Navy in late December 2013. The flag-raising ceremony was held on 17 June 2014, marking its introduction into the Russian Navy.

Severodvinsk became combat-ready in early 2016. At the end of April 2016 and in August 2017, it conducted drills using 3M14 cruise missiles.

On 28 March 2019, it launched a Kalibr cruise missile from a pier at its homebase. Previously, such launches were not possible. The submarine again launched Kalibr cruise missile during the Grom-2019 strategic nuclear exercise on 17 October 2019.

In Autumn 2019, she reportedly participated in the largest post-Cold War Russian submarine drills. The drills, sometimes dubbed as operation, included ten submarines, among them two diesel-electric and eight nuclear. The eight nuclear submarines reportedly constituted the Northern Fleet's entire available non-strategic nuclear submarine fleet at that time. The operation was supposedly testing Russian ability to breach the GIUK gap undetected and sail into the Atlantic Ocean, much like the operations Aport and Atrina in 1985 and 1987, respectively, when the Soviets deployed several SSNs near the U.S. coast before Gorbachev-Reagan meeting. This time, the operation started a week before Commander of the Russian Northern Fleet Aleksandr Moiseyev and Russian Foreign Minister Sergey Lavrov met their Norwegian counterparts in Kirkenes, Norway. The operation was expected to last up to two months.

According to RF Defense Ministry sources, in late 2019 Severodvinsk trained submerging, surfacing and cruise missile fire in the Arctic.

On 5 February 2021, she successfully hit a coastal target in Chiza training ground, Arkhangelsk Oblast with a Kalibr missile. In October 2021, the submarine was reported to have carried out a successful launch of the hypersonic Tsirkon missile from the White Sea at a target in the Barents Sea.

In July 2022, the submarine was monitored on the surface by NATO naval forces as she transitted from the Northern Fleet to the Baltic in company with the Akula-class submarine Vepr. In August 2022, Italian Navy sources reported the detection of a nuclear submarine, reported to be the Severodvinsk, submerged in the Mediterranean Sea to the south of Sicily, making it the first Russian nuclear submarine in the Mediterranean since Kursk and Tomsk in 1999.

References

Yasen-class submarines
Ships built by Sevmash
2010 ships